Valery Plata (born 2 June 2001) is a Colombian professional golfer and LPGA Tour player.

Early life and amateur career 
Plata was born in Florida, United States, but a Colombian citizen growing up in Bucaramanga, Colombia as a neighbor to Mariajo Uribe, winner of the 2007 U.S. Amateur.

Plata qualified for the 2015 and 2016 U.S. Girls' Junior Championship, and represented Colombia at the 2017 Junior Golf World Cup in Japan. She won gold at the 2017 Youth South American Games in Chile. With the Colombia team she won the South American U-15 Team Championship in 2015 and 2016, and the South American U-18 Team Championship in 2017 and 2018.

She attended Michigan State University between 2018 and 2022. Playing with the Michigan State Spartans women's golf team, Plata was a three-time All-Big Ten First Team selection, and named Big Ten Player of the Year in 2020 as a sophomore. In 2021, she won the Big Ten's Mary Fossum Award, an honor given to the Big Ten Conference player with the season's lowest stroke average to par.

Plata played in the Meijer LPGA Classic twice as an amateur, in 2021 and 2022, and made the cut in her first LPGA Tour start. She won the 2021 Women's Amateur Latin America in Argentina, which gave her a place in the field at the 2022 Evian Championship and the 2022 Women's British Open.

Plata represented Colombia at the 2022 Espirito Santo Trophy. At the 2022 Bolivarian Games in Valledupar, Colombia, she won the individual bronze and the mixed team gold, together with Camilo Aguado, Santiago Gomez and Mariajo Uribe, who also is her mentor.

Professional career 
Plata turned professional in November 2022. She finished tied 3rd at LPGA Tour Q-School to earn an LPGA Tour card for 2023.

Amateur wins 

2015 South American U-15 Championship
2017 Colombia National U-18 Championship
2019 Lady Tar Heel Invitational
2021 Indiana Invitational, Women's Amateur Latin America, Patriot All-America Invitational

Source:

Results in LPGA majors 

CUT = missed the half-way cut

Team appearances
Amateur
South American U-15 Team Championship (representing Colombia): 2015 (winners), 2016 (winners)
South American U-18 Team Championships (representing Colombia): 2017 (winners), 2018 (winners)
South American Youth Games (representing Colombia): 2017
Junior Golf World Cup (representing Colombia): 2017
Bolivarian Games (representing Colombia): 2022 (winners)
Espirito Santo Trophy (representing Colombia): 2022

Source:

References

External links 

Colombian female golfers
LPGA Tour golfers
Michigan State Spartans women's golfers
Sportspeople from Santander Department
2001 births
Living people
21st-century Colombian women